Márton Radics (born 2 December 2001) is a Hungarian professional footballer who plays for Diósgyőr on loan from Puskás Akadémia.

Club career
On 11 August 2022, Radics joined Diósgyőr on loan.

Career statistics
.

References

External links

2001 births
Sportspeople from Győr
Living people
Hungarian footballers
Hungary youth international footballers
Hungary under-21 international footballers
Association football midfielders
Puskás Akadémia FC II players
Puskás Akadémia FC players
Csákvári TK players
Gyirmót FC Győr players
Diósgyőri VTK players
Nemzeti Bajnokság I players
Nemzeti Bajnokság II players
Nemzeti Bajnokság III players